Austin Young (born April 12, 1966)  is an American photographer, film maker and new media artist based in Los Angeles, known for both celebrity portraits and documentation of sub and trans culture. Young is co-founder of Fallen Fruit, an art collective that uses fruit as a common denominator for public engagement and collaboration.

Career
Since 1985, Young has been documenting pop, sub, and trans culture while playing with the themes of camp (style), celebrity, gender and identity through portrait photography and film.

Young is one of the creators of the open-source Tranimal Workshop events, launched in 2009 at Machine Project in Los Angeles. The concept of the Tranimal Workshop was a collaboration among Young, Squeaky Blonde and Fade-Dra, with the participation of Mathu Andersen, Jer Ber Jones, Andrew Marlin, and others.

Young's solo art exhibit “YOUR FACE HERE” took place on January 29, 2011 at Pop tART Gallery. Young established his art studio for a five-week residency at Pop tART Gallery in Los Angeles.

Features and shorts
Young's film projects include:

References

External links
 

1966 births
American music video directors
Fashion photographers
American LGBT photographers
Living people
American gay artists
Performance art in Los Angeles
Photographers from Nevada
Photographers from California
21st-century American LGBT people